Betty T. Yee (born October 19, 1957) is an American politician and member of the Democratic Party who served as California State Controller from 2015 to 2023. She previously served as a member of the California Board of Equalization from 2004 to 2015. She won the open seat for Controller in the 2014 election, with 54% of the vote. Yee won reelection in 2018, defeating Republican Konstantinos Roditis in a landslide.

Early life and career
A native of the Parkside district of San Francisco, Yee's parents emigrated from Guangdong Province, China in 1956. She handled the books in her family's neighborhood laundry and dry cleaning business while she grew up.

Originally speaking no English, she spent her grade school years in the San Francisco Unified School District and graduated from Lowell High School before attending the University of California, Berkeley as an undergraduate, attaining a bachelor's degree in sociology. She went on to attend Golden Gate University, from which she earned a master's degree in Public Administration.

Yee worked for the Legislature and was then Governor Gray Davis's Chief Deputy Director for Budget, later saying that "My role was to present all the options possible. Politics came into play. The governor and legislative leaders made decisions that sometimes didn't agree with our recommendations." She then became the Chief Deputy to Board of Equalization member Carole Migden. She was appointed to fill the seat when Migden vacated it after being elected to the State Senate.

Political career
Yee was elected in her own right to the California Board of Equalization in 2006 from the 1st Board District and was re-elected in 2010. She led the successful effort to force Amazon.com to collect sales taxes on online purchases, the so-called "Amazon tax".

She ran for California State Controller in the 2014 election to succeed term-limited Democrat John Chiang, who was elected State Treasurer. In the nonpartisan blanket primary, Republican Ashley Swearengin, the Mayor of Fresno, and Yee finished first and second, respectively. The third-place finisher, Democratic Speaker of the California State Assembly John Pérez, initially called for a recount in 15 counties after official results showed him trailing Yee by just 481 votes out of over 4 million cast; however, he ultimately conceded to Yee more than a month after the primary. Swearengin and Yee competed in the general election, which Yee won by 3,810,304 votes (53.97%) to 3,249,668 (46.03%).

As State Controller, Yee sits on the California State Lands Commission. She supports investing in alternative energy and opposes fracking for oil. An advocate of tax reform, she opposes extending Governor Jerry Brown's temporary tax increases, instead proposing to lower the state sales tax and extend it to currently untaxed services.

Yee also serves as Vice President of California Women Lead, a nonprofit, nonpartisan organization for women holding or interested in running for political office.

Betty Yee sits on the board of trustees for the State Teachers Retirement System.

Personal life 
On July 13, 2018, Yee and her husband were involved in a three-car accident in the Posey Tube between Alameda and Oakland.  Yee and her husband as well as their driver, a California Highway Patrol officer, were transported to a local hospital with non-life-threatening injuries.  The vehicle Yee was riding in was rear-ended by another vehicle and was in turn pushed forward into the vehicle in front of it.  The driver of the rear-ending vehicle was suspected to be under the influence of marijuana.

Electoral history

2006

2010

2014

2018

References

External links

 Government website
 Campaign website

|-

1957 births
21st-century American politicians
21st-century American women politicians
American women of Chinese descent in politics
California politicians of Chinese descent
Democratic Party state constitutional officers of California
Candidates in the 2014 United States elections
Golden Gate University alumni
Living people
Politicians from San Francisco
State Controllers of California
UC Berkeley College of Letters and Science alumni
Women in California politics